Dabolim Airport  is an international airport serving the state of Goa, India. It is the primary airport of the state of Goa. It is operated by the Airports Authority of India (AAI) as a civil enclave in an Indian Navy naval airbase named INS Hansa.

The airport's integrated terminal was inaugurated in December 2013. It was designed by Creative Group, an India-based architecture firm. In fiscal year 2017–2018, the airport handled over 7.6 million passengers and 8.36 million in fiscal year 2019–2020. Several European charter airlines fly to Goa seasonally, typically between November and May. Flights from the UK (London Gatwick Airport and Manchester Airport) are operated by TUI Airways. There are also several seasonal charter flights to various Russian cities.

Because of capacity constraints at the terminal and air traffic congestion due to the military and naval presence, a second airport at Mopa was proposed. It completed its construction on 11 December 2022, with operations starting from 5 January 2023.

History
Until 1961, the airport served as the main hub of the Portuguese India's airline TAIP (Transportes Aéreos da Índia Portuguesa), which on a regular schedule served Daman, Diu, Karachi, Mozambique, Portuguese Timor, and other destinations.

During the Annexation of Goa, in December 1961, the airport was bombarded by the Indian Air Force with parts of the infrastructure being destroyed. Two civilian planes that were in the airport – a Lockheed Constellation from TAP (Transportes Aéreos Portugueses) and a Douglas DC-4 from TAIP – managed to escape with refugees, during the night, to Karachi. In April 1962, it was occupied by the Indian Navy's air wing when Major General K. P. Candeth, who had led the successful military operation into Goa, "handed over" the airport to the Indian Navy before relinquishing charge as its military governor to a Lieutenant Governor of the then Union Territory of Goa, Daman and Diu in June 1962.

For civilian air travel out of Vasco da Gama and Goa, the Indian Navy and the Government of India invited the public sector airline (known now as Indian) to operate at Dabolim from 1966 after the runway was repaired and jet-enabled. A new domestic terminal building was built in 1983, designed to process 350 arrivals and departures simultaneously, while the international terminal, built in 1996 was designed for 250.

Once two vital road bridges across the main waterways of Goa were built in the early 1980s, and Goa hosted the Commonwealth Heads of Government Meeting (CHOGM) in 1983, the charter flight business began to take off at Dabolim a few years later, pioneered by Condor Airlines of Germany.

In 2006, the Indian Civil Aviation Ministry announced a plan to upgrade Dabolim Airport. The construction was scheduled to be completed by the end of 2007. However delays in transfer of the required land from the Navy held up proceedings.

The modernisation project of Dabolim Airport was one of 35 airport expansion projects undertaken by the AAI and, in terms of size and money, was its third largest project after the ones at Chennai and Kolkata airports. It included the construction of an integrated terminal building to replace the older terminals, a multi-level car parking (MLCP) facility to accommodate between 540 and 570 cars and construction of additional parking stands for aircraft. The AAI acquired additional land from the Indian Navy and the State Government for apron expansion and the expansion of the older international terminal building complex. The foundation stone for the terminal was laid on 21 February 2009, the project work began in May 2010 and construction of the terminal began in May 2011. The terminal can handle 2,750 peak hour passengers, cost 3.45 billion and was inaugurated on 3 December 2013.

Economic factors

Dabolim's air traffic control is in the hands of the Indian Navy, which earns revenues from this service on account of aircraft movements. It receives a part of the passenger service fee which is shared between it and the Central Industrial Security Force (CISF). The AAI's prime source of earning is from non-traffic services like passenger facilitation, car park, entry tickets, stalls, restaurants, and shops at the main terminal building and advertising boards.

Capital expenditures (such as for runway expansion) at the airport are covered by AAI. There is a shortage of night parking bays which are at a premium in metro airports like Mumbai. A local association has estimated that about 40 hectares are needed for the civil enclave in comparison to the 14 hectares earmarked at present.

Facilities

Structure
The civil enclave is operated by the AAI. Of the 180 flights daily, there is a very large concentration of civilian traffic in the period between 1:00 pm and 9:00 pm during weekdays, with the balance in the early morning hours. This is because of naval restrictions for military flight training purposes throughout the year. In September 2017, the AAI and the Indian Navy entered into a Memorandum of understanding (MoU) to construct a full-length, parallel taxi track suitable for Boeing 747 type of aircraft and agreed to share the cost of construction. The environmental clearance for the project was received in January 2018. The project, which involved development of a 3,710 metre long parallel taxi track along with associated facilities, would be completed in three phases. The first phase was completed by November 2019. The completed taxiway was opened in December 2019. It raised the capacity of the runway from 15 air traffic movements (ATMs) per hour to 18-20 ATMs per hour.

The Navy's premises straddle the Dabolim runway and consequently its personnel would cross the runway at one point (on foot or bicycles or in vehicles) between flights. As part of the works taken up in 2018, a peripheral road was built and the local traffic would no longer affect flight movement.

Terminal
The airport's integrated terminal building handles both international and domestic passengers. It was opened in December 2013. The building design features aesthetic glass, large steel span structures, and frameless glazing. The 36,000 square metre terminal is designed to cater to five million passengers annually. It is equipped with eight aerobridges. The terminal features an in-line baggage scanning system and a state-of-the-art sewage treatment plant. It has 75 check-in counters, 22 immigration counters for departures, 18 immigration counters for arrivals, 14 security check booths, and eight customs counters. The basement of the four-level terminal has utilities like electricity and cargo handling. The check-in counters are placed on the ground floor while the first floor has security check booths. The second floor has the security hold area where passengers may wait before boarding an aircraft.

The old terminal buildings were closed after the commissioning of the new terminal.

Airlines and destinations
The following airlines operate regular scheduled and charter flights at Dabolim Airport:

Statistics

By 2005, total passengers had increased to 987,700 (1944 domestic plus 762 international passengers per day, year unspecified). The figure for 2004–05 was placed at nearly 1.3 million, giving a daily average of 3,467. The airport director has claimed that 2.2 million passengers used the airport in CY 2006. This rose to about 2.6 million in CY 2007. The airport is ranked among the top ten in the country in terms of passenger traffic. Airport authorities consider that it has been operating at saturation levels since 2004.

Today, Goa's estimated 1200 international flights per year account for some 93% of India's international charter tourist flights. It is estimated that about 300 to 350 thousand international tourists arrive at Dabolim on charter flights. Goa's total international tourists (roughly double the charter passengers) account for 5–10% of the national figure and 10–15% of the country's foreign exchange receipts from tourism. As the weekend morning hours approach saturation due to waves of chartered flights especially from the United Kingdom and Russia, attention is shifting to the night and early morning hours of weekdays for accommodating such flights. Tourists from UK to Goa by air were estimated to number about 300,000 in 2013–14 while those from Russia numbered about 49,000 (by 280 charter flights) in the same period.

Naval station at Dabolim

INS Hansa is India's biggest naval airbase. The air station of the Indian Navy at Dabolim was transferred here from the Sulur Air Force Base in Coimbatore after the liberation of Goa from colonial Portuguese rule in December 1961. In 1983, the Indian Navy began inducting the BAE Sea Harrier into service, basing training activities at Dabolim.

The Harriers were replaced by MiG-29KUBs in 2016.
INS Hansa is also the site of Asia's first Shore Based Test Facility (SBTF), built in 2014 to train pilots of the MiG-29K for the aircraft carrier INS Vikramaditya.

INS Hansa is home to several squadrons of the Indian Navy, operating aircraft such as Mikoyan MiG-29Ks, Kamov Ka-28s, Ilyushin Il-38s, Dornier 228s. The Navy's Sagar Pawan aerobatic team is also based at Dabolim.

Apart from being a naval airbase, INS Hansa hosts the Coast Guard Air Enclave (CGAE) - Goa and also sees regular exercises by Indian Air Force aircraft. The Navy also operates a naval aviation museum near Dabolim Airport.

Military flight training

Military flight training at Dabolim is carried out on five days of the week from 0830 hrs to 1300 hrs, during which civilian flights cannot operate. Some exceptions have been made on rare occasions by the naval ATC, chiefly in the case of foreign airlines. Charter airlines carrying international tourists during the season tend to use the freer civil aviation regimes on weekends (Saturday and Sunday) and in the early morning hours. The blocked time is about 15% of the total on a weekly basis albeit during peak morning hours for civilian flights.

Campaign to revert to civilian status

In early 2007, there were reports of a concerted move by the Navy, the AAI, and the state of Karnataka to extend the runway planned at the naval base at Karwar to 2,500 metres (8,200 ft) to accommodate Airbus A320s and to acquire 75 extra hectares for this purpose. In 2011, the Navy affirmed that Hansa would retain its assets and position as an important station for the Indian Navy, despite the commissioning of INS Kadamba.

Air cargo

An estimated  of cargo were handled annually as of a few years ago  and may have declined since then. Most air cargo is carried in the belly-space of airlines such as Air India rather than in dedicated freighters. As of 2016, all domestic cargo is handled at Dabolim airport. GoAir, Vistara, and other airlines use AAI's facilities, including machines, to process cargo during non-peak hours. AAI has plans to build and operate a 24x7 cargo terminal at Dabolim in the old international terminal. Once completed, the common user terminal for cargo would be able to cater to both domestic and international cargo flights on a continuous basis.

Ground transportation

Passengers can reach the airport using taxis, buses, trains, or automobiles. Local mini-buses connect both Vasco da Gama and Chicalim to the airport. Pre-paid taxis are available from the airport, but these are yellow and black colored like government taxis. If you want pre-book cab you can use cabgoa.com, the leading taxi service in Goa. There are various new transportation plans in the works, including the addition of a second bridge. Meanwhile, plans for a 6-lane, north-to-south expressway are on hold in Goa. A monorail system is also being considered. All these plans have implications for the proposed Mopa Airport and its link to Dabolim and Goa's population centres.

Railway tracks of Indian Railways, which also run through Goa, pass beside the airport. The nearest station is Dabolim railway station. Konkan Railway provides services to Margao in South Goa, Tivim in North Goa, Carambolim, and Ponda.

Incidents and accidents

On 1 October 2002, two Ilyushin Il-38s collided and crashed near Dabolim Airport, killing 12 naval personnel in the planes and three civilians on the ground.
On 15 October 2012, two pilots and a technical sailor on board a HAL Chetak helicopter of the Indian Navy were killed after the helicopter crashed whilst landing towards the eastern side of the runway.
On 27 December 2016, Jet Airways flight 9W 2374, a Boeing 737-800, took a 360-degree spin as it veered of the runway damaging the landing gear. Of the seven crew members and 154 passengers, 15 passengers suffered minor injuries. 
On 3 January 2018, a MIG-29K fighter aircraft of the Navy with an trainee pilot crashed off the runway during takeoff at Dabolim Airport. There were no casualties.
On 17 December 2019, a SpiceJet Flight SG 3568, a De Havilland Canada Dash 8, was on final approach for landing when the runway controller noticed that the nose landing gear was not deployed. He immediately alerted the ATC tower and informed the aircraft to abort the landing and make a second attempt after a go around. The second attempt proved unsuccessful. In the third attempt the landing gear was partially deployed and the aircraft safely landed at Dabolim Airport. There were no casualties.

See also
 Airports in India
 List of busiest airports in India by passenger traffic

References

External links

 Dabolim Airport at Airports Authority of India web site
 
 

Airports in Goa
Buildings and structures in Goa
Transport in Goa
Airports established in 1955
1955 establishments in Portuguese India
International airports in India
20th-century architecture in India